Good Day! (originally known as Good Morning!, and alternately known in later years as The Good Day Show and Good Day! Live) is an American morning television program which aired from September 24, 1973 until October 11, 1991. Produced by WCVB-TV in Boston, Good Day! aired on that local ABC affiliate for its entire 18 years of production, airing in various timeslots (which changed throughout the years) between 9 and 11 a.m. on WCVB's morning schedule. The program was later syndicated to seventy-one American television markets, expanding its viewership beyond its primary New England viewer base.

Good Day! is credited for being one of the prototypes for ABC's Good Morning America, as its format, which combined news and information with talk and lifestyle features, was adopted by the subsequent national ABC morning television program, and eventually by its competitors on CBS, NBC, and on other networks.

The program has no relation to the current group of local morning shows produced by the Fox owned-and-operated television stations, all of which use the Good Day title.

Synopsis

Format and early years
Good Day!, which first premiered in 1973 as Good Morning!, was a morning variety program with light news features, but with an overall focus on interviews with celebrities and experts in particular fields, along with a regular amount of musical, dance and scripted theater performances. Interviews with politicians and other key newsmakers were also featured, often conducted right in WCVB's studios on the program's set, but sometimes done via satellite. The show would also conduct special segments, or entire broadcasts, outdoors at several different Boston-area events, with the hosts interacting with event participants—and the general public—as they staged their activities. The program's original hosts were John Willis, Janet Langhart and Mortisha Palmer. After the first year, Palmer left the program, and it was the on-screen camaraderie of Willis and Langhart that became synonymous with the program.

For much of its run, Good Day! was broadcast live from a set that merged both a large, sweeping living room area with a sizeable kitchen, the latter of which was used very often for cooking segments. In the mid-to-late 1980s, the in-studio set came to resemble more of a giant, elegant-looking open foyer, with a kitchen island moved into the center for the cooking segments. Good Day! also broke ground by taking its entire production on the road and broadcasting from locations outside of the Boston area and around the world—a feat of which was considered exceptional for a locally-produced program.

For a few years beginning in the summer of 1974, WCVB made Good Morning! the cornerstone of their regional New England Network, a six-station link-up between WCVB and a handful of broadcast channels (spanning Rhode Island, Maine and Vermont) which all agreed to air a select amount of WCVB's locally-produced shows. Good Morning! (briefly renamed Good Morning, New England!) continued to build on its early ratings success as a part of this network, with its reach now extending into Canadian markets.

In 1975, when ABC was looking to revamp its new morning talk and news program AM America, they sent network executives out to a few of the ABC affiliates to observe the production of their local morning programs. Good Morning! was among the few that were used as a case study for the AM America retooling, the other principal one being The Morning Exchange on WEWS-TV in Cleveland. ABC entertainment chief Fred Silverman ended up adopting features from both programs, and launched AM America'''s replacement, Good Morning America, in November 1975. Not long after the premiere of Good Morning America, WCVB station manager Bob Bennett confronted Silverman at an affiliate's convention and accused him of deliberately stealing the title of Good Morning!; the two similarly-titled programs were now running back-to-back on WCVB's morning lineup. No legal cease and desist action was finalized against ABC in the matter, however. Finally, after months of possible confusion between the two programs, the Boston-based Good Morning! changed its name to Good Day! on Monday, August 2, 1976, the same day that the program began to be syndicated to TV markets beyond New England.

Host changes

Exit Janet Langhart, enter Meryl Comer
In 1978, the first significant host changes took place on Good Day!. Janet Langhart left the program in June of that year, as she accepted NBC's offer to be the New York-based co-host on the network's new daytime talk program America Alive!. In searching for Langhart's replacement, the producers of Good Day! decided to hire John Willis' former co-host from WTTG-TV's Panorama program, Meryl Comer. There was much promotional fanfare of the pairing of Willis and Comer; despite solid chemistry on-screen between the two longtime friends and colleagues, ratings for Good Day! began to decline in the 1978-79 season. After one year as co-host, Comer returned to the Washington, DC market.

At the same time Comer joined the show, Michael Young joined as principal location host and studio host. During his tenure, Young began hosting "Kids Are People, Too" for ABC Network and commuting to New York City.  After winning the Emmy, Young left WCVB and moved with "Kids Are People, Too" to Hollywood.

Eileen Prose
During the Willis/Comer tenure, the producers brought in Eileen Prose as a substitute host. Prose, a former 1966 Miss America contestant, was a multi-talented television personality who brought her skills as a host, interviewer and singer to Good Day!. Her capacities helped so much that by August 1979, after Comer's departure, Prose was named permanent co-host.

Early 1980s
In 1980, after two years in New York, Langhart returned to the program as a third co-host, alongside Willis and Prose. Coinciding with Langhart's return, the program adopted the modified title of The Good Day Show, which lasted during the 1980–81 season. Langhart left the program again at the close of that season when she was hired to be a field correspondent on the 1981 syndicated weekday revival of You Asked for It. Willis and Prose then held the reins together as Good Day! hosts for the next two years. Willis retired from the program in September 1983, and was succeeded by Tim White, who remained with the program for just over one year.

Rotating co-hosts, 1985-1991
In 1985, Prose became the single year-round host of the program. Langhart, whose Boston TV exposure had most recently been on CBS affiliate WNEV-TV (present-day WHDH), and psychologist Dr. Tom Cottle, who had been a regular contributor to Good Day!,  became rotating co-hosts; Langhart co-hosted six months out of the year, while Cottle appeared for the other six. One of the rotating co-hosts remained as a contributor while the other was co-hosting. This format remained until June 1987, when Langhart left the program for the final time. During the years from 1985 through 1991, Prose would by joined by various celebrities as guest co-hosts, many of them stars of the ABC and syndicated programming seen on WCVB. Prose remained the single host of Good Day! until its cancellation in 1991.

Ted Reinstein, longtime co-host/correspondent of WCVB's nightly newsmagazine Chronicle, was a correspondent for Good Day! in its final years.

Cancellation
In September 1991, WCVB general manager S. James Coppersmith announced the cancellation of Good Day! after 18 years, due to New England's then-current economic downturn putting severe constraints on the local broadcast stations. The demise of Good Day! followed a wave of other locally produced programs coming to an end in the Boston market within that same year, also due to a lack of financial viability in a struggling economy; among them were WBZ-TV's Evening Magazine, WHDH-TV's Ready to Go and Our Times, WGBH-TV's The Ten O'Clock News, and a host of others. The final episode of Good Day! aired on Friday, October 11, 1991. The following Monday, WCVB replaced it with ABC's The Home Show'', which premiered in 1988 but had not been carried by WCVB up to that point.

References

External links
 http://www.wcvb.com/WCVB-s-Station-Timeline/11269326

1980s American television news shows
1990s American television news shows
1973 American television series debuts
1991 American television series endings